Arthur Cazaux was the defending champion but retired from his match with Stuart Parker in the final; 6–4, 4–1.

Seeds

Draw

Finals

Top half

Bottom half

References

External links
Main draw
Qualifying draw

Nonthaburi Challenger III - 1